Duke of Clarence and St Andrews was a title awarded to a prince of the British Royal family. The creation was in the Peerage of Great Britain.

While there had been several creations of Dukes of Clarence (and there was later a Duke of Clarence and Avondale), the only creation of a Duke of Clarence and St Andrews was in 1789 for Prince William, third son of King George III. When William succeeded his brother to the throne in 1830, the dukedom merged in the crown.

Duke of Clarence and St Andrews (1789)
See also Earl of Munster (1789)

| Prince William HenryHouse of Hanover1789–1830
| 
| 21 August 1765Buckingham House, Londonson of George III and Charlotte of Mecklenburg-Strelitz
| Adelaide of Saxe-Meiningen11 July 1818
| 20 June 1837Windsor Castle, Windsoraged 71
|-
| colspan=5|Prince William Henry ascended as William IV in 1830 upon his brother's death; and his hereditary titles merged in the Crown.
|-
|}

Family tree

References

Extinct dukedoms in the Peerage of Great Britain
1789 establishments in Great Britain
British and Irish peerages which merged in the Crown
Noble titles created in 1789